N. Cheluvaraya Swamy is an Indian politician from Karnataka.

Personal life
N. Cheluvaraya Swamy was born on 1 June 1960 to Shri Narasimhegowda and Smt. Sakamma. He was born in Ijjala-Ghatta, Mandya district, Karnataka, into an agricultural family in a small village in Nagamangala taluk, Cheluvarayaswamy grew up like any other rural India boy. 
He is married to Smt. B K Dhanalakshmi and has 2 sons. He has a diploma in Civil Engineering.

Political career
N. Cheluvaraya Swamy was member of Zilla panchayat from 1994 to 1999, he was vice president of it between 1996 and 1997. Then he was elected to Karnataka Legislative Assembly for two terms between 1999 and 2008. He was cabinet minister of Government of Karnataka. Later, he was elected to 15th Lok Sabha in 2009 from Mandya (Lok Sabha constituency). He resigned from Lok Sabha in 2013 when he was elected to Karnataka assembly from Nagamangala seat as JD-S candidate. In 2018 he crossed over to Congress but lost his Vidhan Sabha seat to Suresh Gowda of his former party JD-S in Nagamangala.

References

1960 births
Living people
India MPs 2009–2014
Janata Dal (Secular) politicians
Lok Sabha members from Karnataka
Indian National Congress politicians
Indian National Congress politicians from Karnataka